The red-backed sierra finch (Idiopsar dorsalis) is a species of bird in the family Thraupidae.

It is found in the Southern Andean Yungas of Bolivia and northern Chile and Argentina, where its natural habitat is subtropical or tropical high-altitude grassland.

References

red-backed sierra finch
Birds of the Southern Andean Yungas
red-backed sierra finch
Taxonomy articles created by Polbot
Taxobox binomials not recognized by IUCN